St Peter and St Paul's Church, Sturton-le-Steeple is a Grade II* listed parish church in the Church of England in Sturton le Steeple, near Retford in Nottinghamshire. It is currently in the Clays Group of churches.

History
The church dates from the 12th century. It burned down in 1901 and was rebuilt by Charles Hodgson Fowler opening in 1902.

Sturton Le Steeple is the birthplace of John Robinson, the "Pilgrim Pastor".

Bells 
There are six bells in an eight bell cast iron frame. The back five bells are dated 1825 and were cast by Thomas II Mears. The treble was cast in 1991 by John Taylor & Co. The tenor weighs 10 cwt and the treble weighs 5 cwt.

Monuments

There are monuments to Lady Oliva de Montbegon (d 1236), and Dame Frances Earle (d. 1687). A marble slab marks the grave of Francis Thornhagh, the Parliamentary commander, who was killed at the Battle of Preston.

References

12th-century church buildings in England
Church of England church buildings in Nottinghamshire
Churches completed in 1902
Grade II* listed churches in Nottinghamshire